Kevin Keith Phillips (May 29, 1954 – November 13, 2017) was a Canadian politician who was elected to the Legislative Assembly of Saskatchewan in the 2011 election. He represented the electoral district of Melfort as a member of the Saskatchewan Party caucus.

Before politics

Prior to his election to the legislature, Phillips was the mayor of Melfort (2006-2011) where he had lived for more than 40 years. Phillips was in the advertising business prior to politics and was a partner in the Melfort Journal.

Death
Phillips died suddenly while still in office on November 13, 2017 at the age of 63.

References

1954 births
2017 deaths
People from Melfort, Saskatchewan
Mayors of places in Saskatchewan
Saskatchewan Party MLAs
21st-century Canadian politicians